Felix Kaspar (January 14, 1915 in Vienna, Austria – December 5, 2003 in Bradenton, Florida, U.S.) was an Austrian figure skater, twice World champion, and 1936 bronze medalist.

Kaspar began figure skating at age of 9. He trained on the artificial ice rink of Eduard Engelmann Jr. Kaspar was famous for his high jumps.

At the beginning of World War II Kaspar was in Australia, where he met his wife, June. The couple was married for 54 years. They had one daughter named Cherie. Kaspar spent the whole time of the World War II in Australia.

In the late 1950s and early 1960s, Kaspar taught in Hershey, Pennsylvania.  In 1965 he moved with his family to Minneapolis, Minnesota and worked there as a coach at the figure skating center in Golden Valley in the Twin Cities. Amongst others, he coached the Japanese Emi Watanabe while there.

In 1977 he moved with his family to Pasadena, California and worked there also as a figure skating coach.

In 1998 Kaspar has been admitted to the World Figure Skating Hall of Fame. 

In 1989 Kaspar and his wife retired to Florida. Felix Kaspar died at the age of 88 while suffering from Alzheimer's disease.

Results

See also

 Figure Skating
 World Figure Skating Championships
List of select Jewish figure skaters

External links
 

1915 births
2003 deaths
Austrian male single skaters
Olympic bronze medalists for Austria
Olympic figure skaters of Austria
Figure skaters at the 1936 Winter Olympics
Olympic medalists in figure skating
Figure skaters from Vienna
World Figure Skating Championships medalists
European Figure Skating Championships medalists
Medalists at the 1936 Winter Olympics
Jewish Austrian sportspeople
Austrian emigrants to the United States